This is a list of secondary highways in Thunder Bay District, most of which serve as logging roads or provide access to the isolated and sparsely populated areas in the Thunder Bay District of northern Ontario.

Highway 527 

Secondary Highway 527, commonly referred to as Highway 527 is a provincial maintained secondary highway in the Canadian province of Ontario. It is one of the longest secondary highways in the province; only Highway 599 is longer.

The Gull Bay First Nation occupies one of the few permanent settlements on Highway 527, Gull Bay Reserve, situated on the western shore of Lake Nipigon about 70 kilometres south of Armstrong. The highway also passes the start of Highway 811 along its route.

Highway 527 was created in the 1950s as a forest access road and designated Highway 800 in 1963. Throughout the 1960s, the route was gradually extended until it reached what is now Highway 811 in 1969. The route was designated Highway 527 in 1976. Except within the communities of Armstrong and Gull Bay, there are no services or development along this road.

Highway 580 

Secondary Highway 580, commonly referred to as Highway 580 is a secondary highway in the Canadian province of Ontario. It is served to connect between Highway 11 near Beardmore to Poplar Lodge near Lake Nipigon. It is also known as The Spruce River Road.

Highway 582 

Highway 582 is a short secondary highway in the Canadian province of Ontario, which serves to connect the small community of Hurkett to Highway 17, the main route of the Trans-Canada Highway through the area. 

Highway 582 is itself a former route of Highway 17, which was given its current number when a new alignment of Highway 17 between the two endpoints was later constructed.

Highway 584 

Secondary Highway 584, commonly referred to as Highway 584 is a secondary highway in the Canadian province of Ontario. The road is signed as Michael Power Boulevard, First Avenue North, Third Street North, and Center Street.

Highway 585 

Highway 585 is a 36 kilometre road in the Thunder Bay District of Northwestern Ontario, starting at Trans-Canada Highway 11/17 in Nipigon. It travels northward, parallel to the Nipigon River, through the community of Cameron Falls to the Pine Portage Hydroelectric Power Plant.

Highway 586 

Secondary Highway 586, commonly referred to as Highway 586 is a secondary highway in the Canadian province of Ontario. The route was assigned in 1956, when Highway11 was known as Highway 120.

Highway 587 

Highway 587 is a secondary highway 40 kilometres away from Thunder Bay on the Sibley Peninsula. It travels 15 kilometres in the Township Of Shuniah then 22 kilometres in the Sleeping Giant Provincial Park. It begins at pass lake truck stop at Highway 11/Highway 17, and ends at Silver Islet, where it makes a  loop around to connect with itself. Locations along the route include Pass Lake, Silver Islet and a campground called Marie Louise Lake Campground.

History 
Highway 587 started out as a logging road in the 1800s and a connection to the silver mines at Silver Islet, Ontario.
Later about the 1870s Sleeping Giant Provincial Park was incorporated and Highway587 was in the planning stages. Finally about 1940 it was finished. The route was assumed as a provincial highway in 1956.

Highway 588 

Secondary Highway 588, commonly referred to as Highway 588, is a provincially maintained highway in the Canadian province of Ontario, located in Thunder Bay District.

Route description 
Highway 588 is a  road in the Thunder Bay District of Northwestern Ontario, starting at Trans-Canada Highway 11/17 in Stanley, Ontario. It travels to approximately 10 kilometres west of the village of Suomi. The highway intersects with Highway 595 south of Hymers, Highway 590 in Nolalu, and Highway 593 between Nolalu and Suomi.

Major intersections

Highway 589 

Highway 589, also known as Dog Lake Road, is a 31 kilometre road in the Thunder Bay District of Northwestern Ontario, starting at Highway 102 (Dawson Road) in Thunder Bay. It travels north to Dog Lake. The highway intersects with Highway 591 in Lappe.

Towns and Highways 

 Highway 102
 Highway 591
 Lappe, Ontario

Highway 590 

Highway 590 is a 26 kilometre road in the Thunder Bay District of Northwestern Ontario, starting at Trans-Canada Highway 11/17 in Kakabeka Falls. It travels west for approximately 12 kilometres then turns due south to terminate at Highway 588 in Nolalu. It intersects with Highway 595.

Towns and Highways 
Kakabeka Falls
O'Connor
South Gillies
Nolalu

Highway 591 

Highway 591 is an 8 kilometre road in the Thunder Bay District of Northwestern Ontario, starting at Highway 589 in Lappe.

Highway 593 

Highway 593 is a 52 kilometre road in the Thunder Bay District of Northwestern Ontario, starting at Highway 61, three kilometres north of the Pigeon River border crossing at the Canada–US border.  It travels west then north and terminates at Highway 588 between Suomi and Nolalu.

Highway 595 

Highway 595 is a 41 kilometre road in the Thunder Bay District of Northwestern Ontario, starting at Highway 597, 22 kilometres southwest of South Gillies. It travels west then north to Highway 590, 8 kilometres west of Kakabeka Falls. It intersects with Highway 588 south of Hymers and Highway 608 at South Gillies.

Towns and highways 

Highway 588
Highway 590
Highway 597
Highway 608
Gillies
Hymers

Highway 597 

Highway 597 is a  road in the Thunder Bay District of Northwestern Ontario, starting at Highway 595 in the Cloud Lake area. It travels north to Highway 608, east of South Gillies.

Highway 608 

Secondary Highway 608, commonly referred to as Highway 608, is a secondary highway in the Thunder Bay District of Northwestern Ontario, starting at Highway 595 in South Gillies.

Towns and highways 

 Highway 597
 Highway 61
 Neebing, Ontario
 South Gillies

Highway 614 

Secondary Highway614, commonly referred to as Highway614, is a secondary highway in the Canadian province of Ontario, located in Thunder Bay District. The route connects Highway 17 (the Trans-Canada Highway) east of Marathon with the mining town of Manitouwadge, where it ends at Adjala Avenue. Highway614 was assumed in early 1956.

Highway 625 

Secondary Highway625, commonly referred to as Highway625, is a secondary highway in the Canadian province of Ontario, located in Thunder Bay District. The route begins at Tamarac Drive in the community of Caramat. Highway625 was assumed on April17, 1958.

Highway 627 

Secondary Highway627, commonly referred to as Highway627, is a secondary highway in the Canadian province of Ontario, located in Thunder Bay District. The route begins at the visitor's centre for Pukaskwa National Park, from which it travels north  to end at Highway 17 (the Trans-Canada Highway) just east of Marathon. Highway627 was assumed on July17 and July30, 1958, connecting Heron Bay with Highway17.
It was extended south through the Ojibways of the Pic River First Nation to Pukaskwa National Park circa 1982.

Highway 628 

It travels east to the town of Red Rock.

Highway628 was assumed by the Department of Highways, predecessor to the Ministry of Transportation on July28, 1961.
It remained unchanged from then until 2015, when construction began on four laning Highway11/17 between Red Rock Road9 and Stillwater Creek.

Highway 643 

Secondary Highway643, commonly referred to as Highway643, is a secondary highway in the Canadian province of Ontario, located in Thunder Bay District. The northern terminus intersects Exton Road northwest of Aroland First Nation while the southern terminus intersects Highway 584 near Exton. A proposed all-season access road would connect Marten Falls First Nation to Highway643.

Highway643 was assumed by the Department of Highways, predecessor to the modern Ministry of Transportation, in 1963. Although a short 1km section within Danford Township was assumed on November7, the majority of its length through Rupert Township and Exton Township was assumed on November21.

References